Saxonerpeton is an extinct genus of microsaur of the family Hapsidopareiontidae. Fossils have been found from Early Permian strata near Dresden, Germany.

See also

 List of prehistoric amphibians

References

External links
Saxonerpeton in the Paleobiology Database

Permian amphibians of Europe
Fossil taxa described in 1978